The World Before may refer to:
 The World Before (novel)
 The World Before (The Walking Dead)